LATAM Perú Flight 2213 (LP2213/LPE2213) was a scheduled domestic passenger flight in Peru from Lima to Juliaca. On 18 November 2022, the Airbus A320neo operated by LATAM Perú (on behalf of LATAM Chile) was taking off from Jorge Chávez International Airport when it collided with a fire engine that was crossing the runway, killing two firefighters and injuring a third. All 102 passengers and six crew aboard escaped, with 40 being injured. 

The aircraft was damaged beyond repair and written off as a result of the accident, making it the first hull loss of the Airbus A320neo family.

Crash
LATAM Perú Flight 2213 was scheduled to depart Jorge Chávez International Airport in Lima at 14:55 PET (19:55 UTC) and arrive at Inca Manco Cápac International Airport in Juliaca at 16:30 PET (21:30 UTC).

The aircraft commenced its takeoff roll on runway 16 at 15:11. During the take-off roll, multiple airport crash tenders and fire engines on a planned emergency drill crossed the runway in front of the accelerating aircraft. The pilots rejected the takeoff to attempt to avoid one of the trucks and one of the trucks turned right to attempt to avoid the aircraft, but both ended up colliding. A video posted on social media showed the moment the aircraft collided with one of the trucks, with the aircraft's right engine separating and the right landing gear collapsing. Another video posted on social media showed the plane tipped over to its right side as it moved across the runway on fire, rapidly smoking as it stopped. The aircraft came to rest  down the runway. Several photos of the aftermath showed a destroyed fire engine and the aircraft resting on its right wing with fire damage to the rear fuselage.

Aircraft
The aircraft involved in the accident was a five-year-old Airbus A320neo with manufacturer serial number 7864, registered as CC-BHB. It was delivered to LATAM Chile in November 2017. The aircraft was powered by two Pratt & Whitney PW1127G engines. The aircraft was damaged beyond repair and was subsequently written off.

Aftermath
As a result of the accident, at least four flights were diverted to nearby airports. Lima Airport Partners stated that the runway was closed, therefore suspending all operations at the airport until operations resumed on 20 November. The pilots of the aircraft were arrested soon after the accident and held in custody until the following day, prompting the International Federation of Air Line Pilots' Associations (IFALPA) to criticize the Peruvian government for acting contrary to International Civil Aviation Organization guidelines, saying that the arrest and detention were "extremely detrimental to flight safety and can only hinder the investigation." IFALPA said that the arrest could create the public impression that the accident was intentionally caused by the pilots rather than by "technical issues or a string of errors originating from multiple factors."

Investigation 
The accident is being investigated by the Commission for the Investigation of Aviation Accidents (CIAA) with assistance from the French Bureau of Enquiry and Analysis for Civil Aviation Safety (BEA). The flight recorders will be sent to France for analysis.

See also

 List of accidents and incidents involving commercial aircraft
 2017 South Sudan Supreme Airlines Antonov An-26 crash
 Ozark Air Lines Flight 650 – Struck a snowplow on landing, severely damaging aircraft.
 Aeroflot Flight 3352 – Struck maintenance vehicles on landing resulting in crash.
 Western Airlines Flight 2605 – Struck runway construction equipment on landing resulting in crash.
 Singapore Airlines Flight 006 – Struck runway construction equipment on takeoff resulting in crash.

References

External links 

2022 disasters in Peru
2020s in Lima
Accidents and incidents involving the Airbus A320neo
Airliner accidents and incidents involving ground collisions
Aviation accidents and incidents in 2022
Aviation accidents and incidents in Peru
Callao Region
November 2022 events in South America